The first series of Made in Chelsea, a British structured-reality television programme, began airing on 9 May 2011 on E4. The series concluded on 27 June 2011 after 8 episodes. The show was first announced in April 2011 and was described as a "fly-on-the-wall-drama". Filming for the series took place between January and May 2011, with the first full-length trailer airing 28 April 2011. This series includes Spencer and Funda's turbulent relationship come to an end after his childhood sweetheart Caggie comes back into his life, Hugo being torn between two women; Millie and Rosie, and best friends Francis and Fredrik both realising they've fallen for the same girl. It also features the breakdown of Ollie and Gabriella's relationship as he eventually has the courage to come out as bisexual. The DVD for the series was released on 19 September 2011 and features all 8 episodes.

Cast

Episodes

{| class="wikitable plainrowheaders" style="width:100%; background:#fff;"
|- style="color:black"
! style="background:#FF5F5F;"| SeriesNo.
! style="background:#FF5F5F;"| EpisodeNo.
! style="background:#FF5F5F;"| Title
! style="background:#FF5F5F;"| Original airdate
! style="background:#FF5F5F;"| Duration
! style="background:#FF5F5F;"| UK viewers

|}

Ratings

External links

References

2011 British television seasons
Made in Chelsea seasons